Panagiotis Skagiopoulos (Greek: Παναγιώτης Σκαγιόπουλος, 1864–1942) was a Greek merchant and was a grape trader of a large company, the largest part that he help the philanthropic sentinel, a transaction that he done as he loved in Patras.  In 1926, he built an orphanage centre where it still exist today in the city.  The neighbourhood of Skagiopouleio is named after him.

References
The first version of the article is translated and is based from the article at the Greek Wikipedia (el:Main Page)

1864 births
1942 deaths
Businesspeople from Patras